Julián Mauricio Rápalo Agüero (born 9 August 1986) is a Honduran footballer who currently plays for Marathón.

Club career
In summer 2011, clubs like Platense and Victoria were reportedly interested in Rápalo but he chose to stay with Savio. He rejoined his youth team Marathón for the 2012 Apertura.

International career
He was part of the Honduran U-20 team at the 2005 World Youth Championship in the Netherlands.

References

1986 births
Living people
People from Cortés Department
Association football midfielders
Honduran footballers
Deportes Savio players
C.D. Marathón players
Liga Nacional de Fútbol Profesional de Honduras players